Klang Sentral is a commercial hub in the northern part of the royal town of Klang in Selangor, Malaysia. Developed by Titijaya Group's subsidiary of NPO Development, the RM300 million development is expected to take up  of freehold land.

Klang Sentral is also the new controversial and highly debated ultra-modern transport terminal for the local and intercity bus and taxi services in Klang. The RM40 million bus and taxi terminal which started to operate on 27 December 2008  is located nearby to the Setia Alam (part of Shah Alam) and Aman Perdana (part of Klang) townships. It is situated about 9 kilometers away from the Klang town centre.

History 
Klang Sentral was a Build-Operate-Transfer (BOT) project between the developer and the Klang Municipal Council (MPK). The concession agreement was signed in January 2007 during the administration of the former Barisan Nasional state government in Selangor.

The project was planned by Selangor State Urban Planning Department (JPBD) for the development of Klang Town in the 1990s. The plan was taken seriously by Klang Municipal Council (MPK) when the former Klang bus and taxi terminal was burnt down by fire on 19 May 2003 and increasing traffic congestion in the town.

The developer of Klang Sentral had built the terminal and contribute the  land to the state government, with total cost of RM 40million to the developer. For this reason, the developer was given a 30-year concession rights to operate the bus and taxi terminal after which the ownership of the terminal shall be given to MPK. It is one of the few project that is continued by the administration of Pakatan Rakyat state government in Selangor.

However, if MPK decides not to relocate the former Klang bus and taxi terminal (which is located right in the heart of the town centre) to Klang Sentral, MPK will have to pay a sum of RM13 million compensation charges to the developer.

Changes in Bus Routes 

 South Klang to KL - bus users may take any Banting-KL or Port Klang-KL buses from any bus stops and go to KL directly without going into Klang Sentral. Bus users may take buses from Pickup Point P2, P3
 North Klang to KL - bus users may take bus in Klang Sentral.
 Klang to South Klang - bus users may take bus in Pickup Point P1.
 Klang Sentral to South Klang - bus users may take all local/stage bus in Klang Sentral.
 Local/Stage buses - bus users may take bus from any bus stop and the final destination of bus will be ended in Klang Sentral.
 Intra-city buses - Bus users may buy ticket and take buses in Klang Sentral.

Facilities 

 24 hours security.
 CCTV.
 Fully air-conditioned terminal, including waiting area, ticket counter and others.
 Air-conditioned lounge.
 Public Address System for bus arrival and departure.
 Covered bus platform.
 Disable-friendly.
 LCD TV fitted with Electronic Coach Information System. 
 Ample of waiting/holding bay for buses.
 Lift and escalator.
 Toilet with Baby Changing Room.
 Car parking.

Controversies 

Even though before the new bus and taxi terminal at Klang Sentral starts to operate,  there have been a few controversies surrounding the project. The development itself is located at the far north end of Klang and is not within the vicinity of the Klang town centre. It is also located far away from the Klang Komuter station. Many passengers and bus operators have complained about the higher transportation costs and longer time spent to commute around.

Bus operators at Klang Sentral were being charged RM900 of rental fees per month compared with just RM150 at the old Klang bus terminal in the town centre. At the same time, buses are now charged RM10 per entry at Klang Sentral compared with just RM2 at the old station previously. Shops and stall traders at Klang Sentral have also complained about high rental charges. The single-way bus fare to Kuala Selangor from the former bus station was RM4 while the fare from Klang Sentral is RM5.30.

After clarification with Cityliner, the largest bus operator in Malaysia, it is confirmed that single-way bus fare to Kuala Selangor from former bus station is RM5.30, while it is only RM 4.30 from Klang Sentral. Cityliner reaffirmed that there shall be no additional cost passed to the consumer.

The Klang Consumer Association had been protesting against the relocation of the terminal to Klang Sentral since 2005. In addition to that, there are numerous industrial factories nearby, which is a cause for environmental concerns. Also, Klang Sentral is expected to increase the already bad major traffic congestion along Jalan Meru and Jalan Kapar, the two main artery roads in Klang.

After 9 months of operations, Klang Sentral Terminal B for local buses closed down, in June 2009. Terminal A for outstation buses is still open.

Business Competition among Bus Operators 

The local/stage bus operators are:- 
 Cityliner Sdn Bhd
 Wawasan Sutera Sdn Bhd / Seranas Sdn Bhd
 G-Translink
 Permata Kiara
 Causeway Link (Handal Ceria Sdn Bhd) 
 Ilham Untung Sdn Bhd
 RapidKL

The KL-Klang Shuttle operators are:-
 Transnational
 Wawasan Sutera Sdn Bhd / Seranas Sdn Bhd
 Causeway Link (Handal Ceria Sdn Bhd)
 Metrobus Nationwide
 RapidKL

Notes

References 
 Klang Sentral: Great for Business, The New Straits Times
 Klang Sentral: Able to resolve traffic congestion, YB Dr. Xavier Jayakumar (EXCO member of Pakatan Rakyat state government)
 Klang Sentral: Terminal change irks many, The New Straits Times
 Anger over moving Klang bus/taxi station to Klang Sentral, ntv7 News Bulletin
 MPK spent nothing to build
 Why not free shuttle service for Klang Sentral?, Malaysiakini
 Klang Sentral Bus Services Start Saturday, Bernama
 Klang bus station change irks traders
 Angry passengers and clashing politicians, The New Straits Times
 The bus station that tore the opposition apart, Malaysiakini
 A storm in a bus-stop, The Star
 Traders protest move of the Klang bus terminal, New Straits Times
 Bus pick-up points outside old terminal, Metro Edition, The Star

External links 

 Klang Municipal Council (MPK)
 Profile of Klang Sentral
 Klang Community eSpace
 Selangor Urban Planning Department

Klang (city)
Buildings and structures in Selangor
Transport in Selangor